Yamada: The Samurai of Ayothaya is a 2010 Thai action movie directed by Nopporn Watin. The film features renowned Muay Thai boxers Buakaw Por. Pramuk, Saenchai Sor. Kingstar, Yodsanklai Fairtex, and Anuwat Kaewsamrit along with the main cast of actors.

Plot
Attacked and wounded by a group of traitorous Japanese ninja, a mercenary samurai named Yamada (Ozeki) is rescued and nursed back to health by a group of Thai warriors, in service to the King of Ayothaya. Confused by the mysterious identity of his assailants, Yamada stays with the warriors, befriending them, learning their art, and eventually pledging his loyalty and life to their cause and kingdom.

Historical basis
The lead character in the film is based on Yamada Nagamasa, a Japanese adventurer who later became a governor in the Ayutthaya Kingdom.

Cast
Seigi Ozeki as Yamada Nagamasa
Sorapong Chatree as Phra Khru
Kanokkorn Jaicheun as Jumpa
Buakaw Por. Pramuk as Ai-Seua
Thanawut Ketsaro as Kham
Mukuda Hann as Kuroda
Yonthida Nak-ong as Krathin

Guest appearance
Winai Kraibutr as King Naresuan
Bin Bunluerit as King Nanda
Somjit Jongjohor as Bodyguard of King Naresuan
Charoenthong Kiatbanchong as Bodyguard of King Naresuan
Yodsanklai Fairtex as Bodyguard of King Naresuan
Saenchai Sor. Kingstar as Bodyguard of King Naresuan
Anuwat Kaewsamrit as Bodyguard of King Naresuan

References

External links

2010 films
2010s action adventure films
Thai-language films
2010s Japanese-language films
2010s Burmese-language films
Thai martial arts films
Muay Thai films
Thai Muay Thai films
Samurai films
Thai action films